Mykola Anatoliyovych Komarov (born 23 August 1961 in Zaporizhia) is a Ukrainian rower who competed for the Soviet Union in the 1988 Summer Olympics.

At the 1986 World Rowing Championships in Nottingham, he won a silver medal with the eight.

References

External links
 
 

1961 births
Living people
Sportspeople from Zaporizhzhia
Rowers at the 1988 Summer Olympics
Olympic silver medalists for the Soviet Union
Ukrainian male rowers
Soviet male rowers
Olympic rowers of the Soviet Union
Olympic medalists in rowing
World Rowing Championships medalists for the Soviet Union
Medalists at the 1988 Summer Olympics